"September" is the third and final single from Daughtry's second album Leave This Town (2009). This song was co-written by Chris Daughtry and Josh Steely. It was first released June 1, 2010, through RCA Records. The mid-tempo ballad is inspired by Chris's childhood memories growing up with his brother in Lasker, North Carolina.

This song was performed on the ninth season of American Idol on May 12, 2010. "September" debuted at 30 on the Billboard Adult Pop Songs chart.

Background
Daughtry wrote the riff for "September" while he was on tour with Bon Jovi. His bandmate Josh Steely sent Daughtry some lyrical ideas and Chris sent back a lyric based on Steely's outline, which Steely said was "exactly what he was going for, remembering the summer and going back to school". According to Daughtry, "every time I hear that song it takes me back to my summers in Lasker. I loved growing up there, but I knew I'd have leave to make something of my life." The song's lines, "Yeah, we knew we had to leave this town / But we never knew when and we never knew how / We would end up here the way we are" inspired the album's title.  Daughtry wanted "September" as a single, and that it should be released "at the time of the year when it will have meaning".

Music video
The music video was shot on July 1, 2010, at the Stevens Center of the University of North Carolina School of the Arts in Winston-Salem, North Carolina and premiered on Vevo on July 16, 2010. The band is shown performing on stage with photos and home videos of them projected behind them.

Track listing

Chart performance
On the issue dated August 21, 2010, "September" became Daughtry's ninth single to reach the Billboard Hot 100. The single has sold 355,000 digital downloads as of November 24, 2010. On the November 6, 2010 issue, the song reached its peak at number 36 on the Billboard Hot 100, becoming their eighth top-40 single.

Weekly charts

Year end charts

Certifications

Release history

References

Daughtry (band) songs
Rock ballads
Songs written by Chris Daughtry
Song recordings produced by Howard Benson
RCA Records singles
2010 singles
2010 songs